Jim Rose (born July 5, 1953) is an American sports anchor. Rose currently works for ABC 7 Chicago (WLS-TV), the ABC affiliate in Chicago, Illinois; joining the station in January 1982. Prior to working at WLS-TV, Rose worked for WIXT-TV in Syracuse, New York.

Personal
Rose was married to WLS-TV news anchor Cheryl Burton from 1986 until 1995. Rose met Burton while she was a cheerleader for the Chicago Bears in 1985. Rose  has been married to Lakesha Draine since 2011.

References

1953 births
Living people
Television sports anchors from Chicago
Rhode Island College alumni
African-American people